La Cueva may refer to the following places in New Mexico:
La Cueva, Mora County, New Mexico, an unincorporated community
La Cueva, Sandoval County, New Mexico, an unincorporated community and census-designated place
La Cueva, Santa Fe County, New Mexico, an unincorporated community